Kadhilil Sodhappuvadhu Yeppadi is a 2012 Indian romantic comedy film written and directed Balaji Mohan based on the sametitled short film he made. It was simultaneously shot in Tamil and Telugu languages, the latter titled Love Failure. The film stars Siddharth and Amala Paul. It was released worldwide on 17 February 2012 to critical acclaim and was declared a hit.

Plot
Arun (Siddharth) and Parvathi (Amala Paul) give an interview about their love story, but they fight even before the interview gets over. The movie then rewinds five months earlier. Arun meets Parvathi in a college canteen, and they soon become friends. Parvathi has problems at her home, as her mother Saroja (Surekha Vani) wants to divorce her father Akilan (Suresh). Arun and Parvathi fight for trivial reasons and then get together. The movie revolves around how little things may contribute to breakups.

One day, while Parvathi gets stressed up and wants to talk to Arun, he did not answer his phone. They fight on that issue, and gradually, their fight frequency grows. Arun introduces her to his parents, and Arun's father recognizes her as one of his client's daughter. He tells his son that Parvathi's parents are getting divorced. As time progresses, they break up, but the reason is not revealed. Arun's friend Vignesh tries to propose to his junior Rashmi (Dhanya Balakrishna), but she addresses him as brother and then introduces her lover, who is Vignesh's senior. Arun tries to recover from the breakup. Arun's friend calls him to a trip to Pondicherry to see his friend John (Shyam). John's girlfriend Cathy (Pooja Ramachandran) starts a friendly chat with Arun. Cathy wishes to help Arun and asks him why they broke up. Arun says that he does not have any reason, and that is his problem. Since Cathy becomes friendly with Arun, a misunderstanding crops up between Cathy and John. Meanwhile, Akilan approaches Prabhu (Ravi Raghavendra) for a divorce from Saroja. Prabhu, who is Arun's father, advises Akilan to reunite with Saroja after knowing that Akilan is Parvathi's father. Akilan and Saroja unite in Parvathi's grandparents' 80th marriage. Consequently, John realise that Arun and Cathy are just being friendly, and he reunites with Cathy. Also, while Rashmi realizes that her lover (Vignesh’s senior) is a playboy, she realizes this, tells this to Vignesh, and accepts his true love. At last, Parvathi and Arun reunite after a silly quarrel in the same canteen that they met earlier.

Cast

 Siddharth as Arun
 Amala Paul as Parvathi
 Ravi Raghavendra as Prabhu
 Sri Ranjani as Vasanthi
 Suresh as Akilan Venkatesan
 Surekha Vani as Saroja
 Arjunan as Siva
 Vignesh as Vignesh
 Shyam as John
 Balaji Venugopal as Ramakrishnan
 Dhanya Balakrishna as Rashmi
 Bobby Simha as Jayasimha/Rajasimha, Rashmi's boyfriend
 Pooja Ramachandran as Cathy
 Aishwarya Menon as Shivani Sriram
 Vishnuvardhan as Rupesh, Parvathi's Malayali friend 
 Neelu Nasreen as a college professor
 Shiva as a college professor
 Balaji Mohan as a director in a special appearance
 Gayathri Raguram in a special appearance in the song "Alaipaaya Alaipaaya"/"Inthajarae Inthajarae"

Production

Development
Siddharth had said that he watched the ten-minute Tamil short film Kadhalil Sodhappuvadhu Yeppadi by Balaji Mohan and found it interesting, developing an interest to turn it into a mainstream full-length feature film. Incidentally Balaji Mohan was holding talks with Sashikanth Shivaji of YNot Studios then and was planning to approach Siddharth to play the male lead role; Siddharth joined the crew and also decided to co-produce the venture with cinematographer Nirav Shah on their newly launched banner Etaki Entertainment. Owing Siddharth's popularity in Telugu cinema, the film was made as a bilingual, shot simultaneously in Tamil and Telugu as was his previous venture 180. Filming took place in Hyderabad for an urban, modernistic backdrop. Siddharth later confirmed that filming of the film's both versions were completed in a record 35 days. Television actress Deepa Venkat dubbed for the speaking voice of Amala Paul.

Marketing
A first teaser trailer was uploaded by Siddharth on YouTube in December 2011. The filmmaker had started promotions in a unique way to impress the youths. Structured like a comic-book, the print ad introduced to a short conversion between the couple – Siddharth and Amala Paul – and their exchange of thoughts can be seen in the speech balloons. BlueSky purchased the complete overseas theatrical and DVD/VCD rights of romantic comedy entertainer of Siddharth's own production Love Failure. Siddharth also confirmed that the producers had broken even on the project before the theatrical release of the film, presumably by rights sale to TV channels and other means. This marketing and producing strategy was commended by many critics on producing small-budget movies with mainstream stars setting a new trend in the Telugu film industry.

Soundtrack

The soundtrack was composed by S. Thaman. While Madhan Karky penned the lyrics for three songs, director Balaji Mohan himself wrote the lyrics of the song "Ananda Jaladosam"; Sri Mani wrote all lyrics in the Telugu version.

Release
Kadhalil Sodhappuvadhu Yeppadi and Love Failure released on 17 February 2012. Dil Raju had acquired the Telugu distribution rights of the film. The film opened at No.1 in Chennai box office accounting for 40% of the takings. Gradually, shows were increased and it accounted for 49% of the takings in its second weekend. The satellite rights of the film's Tamil version were acquired by STAR Vijay.

Critical reception
The film received positive reviews in both languages. Sify.com's reviewer said that the film was an "enjoyable romantic ride" that worked "largely due to its fresh script which dwells on the magic of love and its illusions", going on to label it as "jolly good fun". The Times of India critic N. Venkateswaran gave it 4 out of 5 and commented that Balaji Mohan had made an "impressive debut with his tale of love and forgiveness", while pointing out that the screenplay was "cleverly written" and the dialogues were written in an "easy, conversational tone and are sure to strike a chord with youngsters". Karthik Subramanian from The Hindu wrote: "KSY [...] is not just an experience. It is a festival. Make sure to take your entire gang along". Behindwoods.com rated the film 3/5 and quoted: "Go for this lighthearted hilarious product!" Indiaglitz.com called it a "feel-good entertainer" and further added: "Though the second half lags a bit, the movie is breezy cool and entertaining. Three cheers Balaji Mohan for a good debut venture".

The Telugu version Love Failure, too, fetched positive feedbacks. The Times of India critic Karthik Pasupleti gave the film 3.5 out of 5 and said: "Right from its unusual-yet-amusing characterization, the background score and the writing, the film is loaded with humour. As if that wasn't enough, it is nicely sugar coated from inside out". Radhika Rajamani from Rediff.com gave it 3.5 out of 5 and noted that the film was "refreshing", further citing: "It is well written and talks about love and failure in the context of life today. It gives an urbane, contemporary and realistic take on the subject. well written and talks about love and failure in the context of life today". Vishnupriya Bhandaram of The Hindu claimed: "Love Failure is a remarkably easy film to watch – no pressure, no headache. Right from the word go, its fresh, the narrative, the characters and the music". Hemanth Kumar of postnoon.com rated it 3.5 and described it as a "charming love story" and a "fantastic character study about people in love and the confusion that prevails over what the other person expects in a relationship". Idlebrain.com reviewer Jeevi, too, gave the film 3.5 out of 5, concluding that it was a "well-made urban romantic comedy told in a fresh an novel style [sic]".

Accolades

References

External links
 

2010s Telugu-language films
Indian multilingual films
2012 films
2012 romantic comedy films
Indian romantic comedy films
Features based on short films
2010s Tamil-language films
Films scored by Thaman S
2012 multilingual films
2012 directorial debut films
Films directed by Balaji Mohan